Leandy "Lee" Young (June 10, 1909 – February 4, 1997) was an American baseball outfielder in the Negro leagues. He played from 1940 to 1946. During the 1944 Negro World Series, Young was injured in a car accident. Fellow players John Britton, Pepper Bassett, and Tommy Sampson were also in the car.

References

External links
 and Seamheads

1909 births
1997 deaths
Birmingham Black Barons players
Kansas City Monarchs players
Oakland Larks players
Baseball players from Texas
20th-century African-American sportspeople
Baseball outfielders